Sleepyhead is the debut studio album by Swedish singer Sibille Attar. It was released in 2013 through Stranded label.

Track listing
"Go On" (3:19)
"Alcoholics" (3:07)
"Julian! I Want To Be a Dancer!" (2:35)
"The Day" (6:03)
"Some Home" (4:04)
"To Turn Half Blue" (4:30)
"Come Night" (3:29)
"Hotel Room" (3:42)
"The Rules" (6:08)
"For Evelina" (4:09)

Charts

References

2013 albums